Zhora Akopyan (born 6 November 1997) is a Belarusian-Armenian kickboxer. He is a former Fair Fight, Tatneft and FEA champion.

Kickboxing career
Akopyan grew up in Polotsk, Belarus, he practiced Karate as a child. His uncle noticed his love for martial arts and brought him to a Muay Thai and Kickboxing club in his hometown when Zhora was 11.
Akopyan won the IFMA gold medal in 2014 after five years of training. The following year he moved to Minsk to join Gridin gym and try to breakout in the professional world.

Akopyan was scheduled to face Eduard King at KOK Elimination Tournament on October 6, 2018. He won the fight by a second-round knockout.

Akopyan was scheduled to face Mirkko Moisar at Number One Fight Show 11 on May 14, 2019. He won the fight by unanimous decision.

Akopyan was scheduled to face Vladislav Ukrainets, in 1/8 of the -70kg tournament held on June 11, 2019. The fight went into an extra round, after which Akopyan won the decision. A month later, on July 20, Akopyan faced Yanis Budagov in the tournament quarterfinals. The fight once again went into an extra round, after which he was awarded a decision.

Akopyan was scheduled to participate in the FEA World Grand Prix, held on August 17, 2019. He beat Stanislav Kazantsev by unanimous decision in the tournament semifinals. Advancing to the finals, he faced Constantin Rusu, whom he beat by decision, after an extra round was fought.

Akopyan was scheduled to face Ilya Sokolov in the semifinals of the Tatneft Cup, held on October 4, 2019. He won the fight by decision, after an extra round was fought.

Akopyan was scheduled to face Ivan Kondratiev in the finals of the 2019 Tatneft Cup -70kg tournament, held on December 15, 2019. He won the fight by unanimous decision.

Akopyan was scheduled to fight a rematch with Rafał Dudek at MGC Promotion on February 29, 2020. The two of them previously fought at DSF Kickboxing Challenge on August 9, 2018, with Dudek winning by decision. Akopyan was more successful in the rematch, as he won by unanimous decision.

Akopyan was scheduled to face Maxim Spodarenko at BFC 65 on December 23, 2020. He won the fight by split decision.

Akopyan was scheduled to fight Maxim Sulgin for the vacant Fair Fight -77kg title at Fair Fight XV on August 28, 2021. He won the fight by split decision.

Akopyan was scheduled to face Jonathan Mayezo at Empire Fight - Vikings Edition on October 2, 2021. He lost the fight by majority decision.

Akopyan was scheduled to face Fabien Bignell at Tour Event Fight 9 on April 2, 2022. Akopyan withdrew from the bout, as the French Federation did not allow him to compete due to sanctions against Belarus in the context of the Russian invasion of Ukraine.

Akopyan faced Mamuka Usubyan at Fair Fight XVII on April 16 2022 for the Fair Fight Lightweight title. He lost the fight by unanimous decision.

Akpyan defeated Daniele Iodice by unanimous decision at PetrosyanMania GOLD EDITION	in Italy on April 30, 2022.

Akopyan faced Sayfullah Khambakadov in a Fair Fight lightweight title eliminator at RCC Fair Fight 19 on November 26, 2022. He won the fight by unanimous decision.

Titles
Professional
TatNeft Arena
 2019 Tatneft Cup -70 kg Champion
FEA World Grand Prix
 2019 FEA WGP -71 kg Champion
Fair Fight
 2021 Fair Fight -77 kg Champion
Multi Fight Club
 2022 MFC Lightweight Champion

Amateur
Belarus Muay Thai Federation
 2013 Belarus Muay Thai Championships Junior Champion
 2014 Belarus Muay Thai Championships Junior Champion
 2019 Belarus Muay Thai Championships -71 kg Runner-up

International Federation of Muaythai Associations
 2014 IFMA Junior World Championships -67 kg 
 2014 IFMA Junior European Championships -67 kg 

World Association of Kickboxing Organizations
 2018 WAKO Belarus Kickboxing Championship -71 kg

Fight record 
   

|- style="background:#cfc;"
| 2022-11-26|| Win ||align=left| Khambakhadov Saifullah || RCC Fair Fight 19 || Yekaterinburg, Russia || Decision (Unanimous) || 3 || 3:00 

|- style="background:#cfc;"
| 2022-04-30|| Win ||align=left| Daniele Iodice|| PetrosyanMania GOLD EDITION || Milan, Italy || Decision (Unanimous)  || 3 || 3:00 

|-  style="background:#fbb;"
| 2022-04-16 || Loss ||align=left| Mamuka Usubyan || Fair Fight XVII || Yekaterinburg, Russia || Decision (Unanimous) ||5  || 3:00
|-
! style=background:white colspan=9 |

|- style="background:#cfc;"
| 2022-03-05|| Win ||align=left| Abdalla Nagy || MFC 1 || Yerevan, Armenia || TKO (Punches) || 4 || 0:30
|-
! style=background:white colspan=9 |

|-  style="background:#fbb;"
|  2021-10-02 || Loss || align="left" | Jonathan Mayezo || Empire Fight - Vikings Edition || Montbéliard, France || Decision (Majority) || 5 || 3:00
|-
! style=background:white colspan=9 |
|-  style="background:#cfc;"
| 2021-08-28 || Win ||align=left| Maxim Sulgin || Fair Fight XV || Yekaterinburg, Russia || Decision (Split)|| 5 || 3:00
|-
! style=background:white colspan=9 |
|-  style="background:#cfc;"
| 2021-08-07 || Win ||align=left| Mathieu Tavares || Number One Fight Show 13 || Tallinn, Estonia || KO (Left Hook to the Body)|| 2 ||
|-  style="background:#cfc;"
| 2020-12-23 || Win  ||align=left| Maxim Spodarenko || BFC 65 || Minsk, Belarus || Decision (Split) || 3 || 3:00
|-  style="background:#cfc;"
| 2020-03-21 || Win ||align=left| Vladislav Ukrainets || Fair Fight XI || Yekaterinburg, Russia || KO (Left Hook to the Body) || 2 ||
|-  style="background:#cfc;"
| 2020-02-29 || Win ||align=left| Rafał Dudek || MGC Promotion || Minsk, Belarus || Decision (Unanimous) || 3 || 3:00
|-  style="background:#cfc;"
| 2019-12-15 || Win ||align=left| Ivan Kondratev || Tatneft Cup, -70 kg Tournament Final || Kazan, Russia || Decision (Unanimous) || 3 || 3:00
|-
! style=background:white colspan=9 |
|-  style="background:#cfc;"
| 2019-11-23 || Win ||align=left| Aaras Anass || Number One Fight Show || Tallinn, Estonia || KO (Punches)  || 2 ||  2:32
|-  style="background:#cfc;"
| 2019-10-04 || Win ||align=left| Ilya Sokolov || Tatneft Cup, -70 kg Tournament Semi Final || Kazan, Russia || Ext.R Decision || 4|| 3:00
|-  style="background:#cfc;"
| 2019-08-17 || Win ||align=left| Constantin Rusu || FEA WGP, Final || Odessa, Ukraine || Ext.R Decision (Unanimous) || 4 || 3:00
|-
! style=background:white colspan=9 |
|-  style="background:#cfc;"
| 2019-08-17 || Win ||align=left| Stanislav Kazantsev || FEA WGP, Semi Final || Odessa, Ukraine || Decision (Unanimous) || 3 || 3:00
|-  style="background:#cfc;"
| 2019-07-20 || Win ||align=left| Yanis Budagov || Tatneft Cup, -70 kg Tournament Quarter Final || Kazan, Russia || Ext.R Decision || 4|| 3:00
|-  style="background:#cfc;"
| 2019-06-11 || Win ||align=left| Vladislav Ukrainets || Tatneft Cup, -70 kg Tournament 1/8 Final|| Kazan, Russia || Ext.R Decision || 4|| 3:00
|-  style="background:#cfc;"
| 2019-05-14 || Win ||align=left| Mirkko Moisar || Number One Fight Show 11|| Tallinn, Estonia || Decision (Unanimous) || 3 || 3:00
|-  style="background:#cfc;"
| 2018-10-06 || Win ||align=left| Eduard King || KOK Elimination Tournament || Chisinau, Moldova || KO || 2 ||
|-  style="background:#fbb;"
| 2018-08-09 || Loss||align=left| Rafał Dudek || DSF Kickboxing Challenge  || Twierdza, Poland || Decision || 3 || 3:00
|-  style="background:#cfc;"
| 2017-11-17 || Win ||align=left| Dmitry Nikokoshev || Royal Fight Minsk || Minsk, Belarus || Decision || 3 || 3:00
|-  style="background:#cfc;"
| 2016-04-23 || Win ||align=left| Henrikas Viksraitis ||  || Lithuania || Decision || 3 || 3:00
|-  style="background:#cfc;"
| 2016-04-23 || Win ||align=left| Sigurds Krauklis ||  || Lithuania || KO || 2 ||
|-  style="background:#cfc;"
| 2015-11-10 || Win ||align=left| Erlandas Kaminsky ||  || Latvia || KO || 1 ||
|-  style="background:#cfc;"
| 2015-11-10 || Win ||align=left| Elvis Jansons ||  || Latvia || Decision || 3 || 3:00
|-  style="background:#cfc;"
| 2015-05-23 || Win ||align=left| Kirill Andreev ||  || Latvia || KO || 1 ||
|-  style="background:#cfc;"
| 2014-01-26 || Win ||align=left| Ilya Kharlamov || League of combat || Belarus || Decision || 3 || 3:00
|-  style="background:#cfc;"
| 2014-01-26 || Win ||align=left| Maxim Savchits || League of combat || Belarus || Decision || 3 || 3:00
|-  style="background:#cfc;"
| 2013-02-23 || Win ||align=left| Dmitry Filonchik ||  || Belarus || Decision || 3 || 3:00
|-
| colspan=9 | Legend:    

|-  style="background:#cfc;"
| 2014-05- || Win ||align=left| Corrie Ellis || IFMA World Championship, Final || Malaysia || Decision ||  || 
|-
! style=background:white colspan=9 |
|-
| colspan=9 | Legend:

See also 
List of male kickboxers

References

1997 births
Living people
Lightweight kickboxers
Armenian kickboxers